Symphony Life Berhad (formerly known as Bolton Berhad) is a Bursa Malaysia listed Malaysian property developer. It was incorporated in 1964 (then known as Bolton Properties Limited) and rebranded as Symphony Life Berhad in April 2013.

Corporate milestone

List of projects 
Klang Valley
Arata of Tijani
Elevia Residences
Taman Tasik Prima
The Wharf
6 Ceylon: The development of 6 Ceylon began in 2009 and is scheduled for completion in 2013. It is a 33-storey condominium which will feature 215 units with built-up areas ranging from 696 sq ft to 1,555 sq ft.
Lavender Heights
Symphony Square 
Tijani Ukay
Tijani 2 North
Tijani 2 South
Tijani Raja Dewa

Penang
Surin

Langkawi
Langkawi Fair

Kedah
Amanjaya

References

External links 
 Symphony Life web site

1964 establishments in Malaysia
Property companies of Malaysia
Companies listed on Bursa Malaysia
Real estate companies established in 1964